Jr. Pac-Man is an arcade video game developed by General Computer Corporation and released by Bally Midway on August 13, 1983. It has the same gameplay as prior entries in the series, but the maze in Jr. Pac-Man scrolls horizontally and has no escape tunnels. The bonus item which moves around the maze changes dots into a form which slows Jr. Pac-Man as they are being eaten.

Gameplay

The core gameplay of Jr. Pac-Man is similar to its predecessors. The player controls the eponymous Jr. Pac-Man (who wears an animated propeller beanie), and scores points by eating all of the dots in the maze, while four ghosts (Blinky, Pinky, Inky, and Tim) chase him around the maze and attempt to catch him. Eating a power pellet turns the ghosts blue, briefly allowing the player to eat them for extra points. Once the maze is cleared, a new maze is presented and the gameplay continues.

The mazes are now two times the width of the monitor and scroll horizontally. A total of seven mazes appear throughout the game, and five of them have six power pellets instead of four, but none of them have tunnels that wrap around from one side of the screen to the other.

Bonus items (such as tricycles, kites, and balloons) appear in each round, starting above the ghosts' lair and moving around the maze as in Ms. Pac-Man. As an item encounters dots, it changes them into larger dots that are worth 50 points instead of 10, but they also slow Jr. Pac-Man down more than regular dots. If an item has been out for long enough and encounters a power pellet, it self-destructs, taking the power pellet with it. When Jr. Pac-Man gets caught by a ghost, the larger dots disappear; if there are only a few left, they revert to their original size.

The between-level intermissions show the developing relationship between Jr. Pac-Man and a small red ghost named Yum-Yum who is apparently the daughter of Blinky.

Ports
An Atari 2600 version developed by General Computer Corporation (the designers of the arcade version) was released by Atari Corporation in 1986 with mazes that scroll vertically rather than horizontally, but is otherwise a faithful adaptation. Jr. Pac-Man was later ported to the Commodore 64 and IBM PC compatibles.

Ports for the Atari 5200 and the Atari 8-bit family were finished in 1984, but were scrapped along with Super Pac-Man when the home divisions of Atari, Inc. were sold to Jack Tramiel.

An unofficial port for the Atari 7800 was published in 2009 by AtariAge.

References

External links
 
 Jr. Pac-Man at the Arcade History database
 Jr. Pac-Man for the Atari 2600 at Atari Mania
 
 ClassicGaming.com entry on Jr. Pac-Man with screenshots of all the mazes and cutscenes

Pac-Man arcade games
1983 video games
Atari 2600 games
Cancelled Atari 5200 games
Cancelled Atari 8-bit family games
Commodore 64 games
Maze games
Midway video games
Video games about children
Video games developed in the United States
Unauthorized video games